Svastra texana is a species of long-horned bee in the family Apidae. It is found in Central America and North America.

Subspecies
These two subspecies belong to the species Svastra texana:
 Svastra texana eluta (LaBerge, 1956)
 Svastra texana texana (Cresson, 1872)

References

Further reading

External links

 

Apinae
Articles created by Qbugbot
Insects described in 1872